Acacia peuce, commonly known as Birdsville wattle, waddy, waddi, or waddy-wood, is a tree species that is endemic to central Australia.
The Arunda peoples know the tree as Aratara, the Pitta Pitta know it as Kurriyapiri and Red Ochre Father while the lower Arrernte know it as Arripar.

Description
It has a distinctive habit more similar to a sheoak or a conifer.

The wood is extremely hard and dense with dark purple coloured heartwood. The trunk and branches are covered with a fibrous grey-brown bark.

The dull green phyllodes are sometimes continuous with the branchlet but are more often articulate,.

It is a very slow growing species and can live up to 200 years. Some individuals are estimated to live over 500 years.

The inflorescence heads are globular and sparse with 5-merous flowers. The flowers are a pale-yellow colour and appear in autumn and spring usually following heavy rain events.

Following flowering the species will form long, flat, pods with a papery texture containing large, flat seeds.

Taxonomy
The species was originally described by the botanist Ferdinand von Mueller in 1863 that was published in the work Fragmenta Phytographiae Australiae. The only synonym is Racosperma peuce as described by Leslie Pedley in 1986 in the work Derivation and dispersal of Acacia (Leguminosae), with particular reference to Australia, and the recognition of Senegalia and Racosperma. published in the Botanical Journal of the Linnean Society.

Acacia peuce is most closely related to A. crombiei and A. carneorum.

Distribution 

Although speculated to have been widespread across central Australia during wetter climates 400,000 years ago, the population is now mostly restricted to three sites, separated by the encroaching Simpson Desert. In the Northern Territory, the species is restricted to the Mac Clark (Acacia peuce) Conservation Reserve which is surrounded by a pastoral lease, Andado Station. The other two sites are near Boulia and Birdsville in Queensland. They grow on shallow sand aprons overlaying gibber or clay slopes and plains and between longitudinal dunes or on alluvial flats between ephemeral watercourses. The soils can be saline or contain high levels of gypsum. The total population is approximately 76,000 individuals spread over a total area of  but with a total area of occupancy of only .

Ecology
The tree usually occurs in pure stands in low open woodlands. Associated species include shrubs such as Rhagodia, Atriplex, Grevillea stricta, Atlaya hemiglauca and Hakea leucoptera. It is more often found with associated grass species such as Astrebla and Eragrostis. Along drainage lines it can also be found along with Eucalyptus coolabah.

See also Evolutionary anachronism#Australasian realm.

Uses
Indigenous Australians used the hard and heavy wood of the tree to produce clubs or waddy.

The tree is host to various butterflies and their larvae and also provides protective habitat for birds from grey falcons to desert finches. The foliage is often chewed by insects, but saplings were eaten by grazers such as cattle and diprotodon. Pastoralists used the tree to make highly durable and termite resistant fenceposts and stockyards from the timber. Stumps coppice vigorously after being cut for posts.

References

peuce
Flora of the Northern Territory
Flora of Queensland
Fabales of Australia
Trees of Australia
Drought-tolerant trees
Plants described in 1863